Puistola is a district of Jyväskylä, Finland on the shores of Tourujoki river near the city centre. The city centre of Jyväskylä is bordering Puistola in Southwest. Puistola is located on a small area between the streets of Vapaudenkatu, Väinönkatu, Yliopistonkatu, Puistokatu and Tourujoki river. Southern part of the district has high population density. The old graveyard of Jyväskylä is in the Northern parts of the district.

Gallery

External links 

Dark corners of Tourujoki Park on a Youtube video 

Neighbourhoods of Jyväskylä